Joseph H. Lewis (April 6, 1907 – August 30, 2000) was an American B-movie film director whose stylish flourishes came to be appreciated by auteur theory-espousing film critics in the years following his retirement in 1966. In a 30-year directorial career, he helmed numerous low-budget westerns, action pictures, musicals, adventures, and thrillers. Today he is remembered for mysteries and film noir stories: My Name Is Julia Ross (1945) and So Dark the Night (1946) as well as his most highly regarded features, 1950's Gun Crazy, which spotlighted a desperate young couple (Peggy Cummins and John Dall) who embark on a deadly crime spree, and the 1955 film noir The Big Combo, with its stunning cinematography by John Alton.

Life and career
Born in Brooklyn, the son of Russian Jewish immigrants, Ernestine (née Miriamson) and Leopold Lewis. His father was an optometrist. He grew up on the Upper East Side of New York City and attended DeWitt Clinton High School in the Bronx and when his brother, Ben, moved to Hollywood in 1927, he decided to follow with the hope of becoming an actor. Ben found him a job as camera assistant and, subsequently, young Joseph became an assistant film editor just as the film industry was converting to sound.  He began his directorial career (1937–40) by turning out low-budget B-Westerns starring Bob Baker, Charles Starrett, and Bill Elliott. Film editors referred to Lewis as "Wagon-Wheel Joe,"   because of his tendency to use wagon wheels in the foreground to create interesting visual compositions.

Lewis was equally comfortable working in different genres: horror (Bela Lugosi, The Invisible Ghost), comedy (The East Side Kids, That Gang of Mine), detective mystery (Tom Conway, The Falcon in San Francisco), costume adventure (Larry Parks, The Swordsman), and musicals (Benny Fields, Minstrel Man). Lewis's creative compositions for Minstrel Man won him the assignment of staging the musical sequences for The Jolson Story.

Today, Lewis is primarily known for his work in film noir during the 1940s and early 1950s. Gun Crazy is a dark romance about gun-obsession, notable for its use of location photography and, for film students and buffs, a particularly arresting shot which lasts for ten minutes, as the audience suddenly becomes a passenger in the getaway car following a bank robbery committed by the young leads.

Toward the end of Lewis's career, he worked in television, directing mostly westerns:  The Rifleman, Bonanza, The Big Valley, Gunsmoke, and the pilot for Branded. He also directed the 1961 CBS crime adventure-drama series The Investigators.

Lewis suffered a major heart attack at the age of 46, but continued working until his 59th birthday in April 1966, at the end of the 1965–66 TV season. He later lectured at film schools and fan gatherings as well as at retrospectives such as the Telluride Film Festival, along with European venues in France, Germany and other locations.  In 1997 he became the recipient of the Los Angeles Film Critics Association Lifetime Achievement Award.

Nearly five months after his 93rd birthday, Lewis died at his home in Los Angeles County's seaside community of Marina del Rey.  Active until the end, he made his final public appearance five weeks earlier to introduce a screening of Gun Crazy at the University of California at Los Angeles. He was married to Buena Vista Lewis; they had one daughter, Candy Lewis Sangster.

Selected filmography

References

External links

Further reading
Maltin, Leonard.  Leonard Maltin's Movie Encyclopedia.  A Plume Book, 1995. p. 527–8.
Katz, Ephraim. The Film Encyclopedia (fourth edition). New York:HarperResource, 2001, p. 826.
Thomson, David.  The New Biographical Dictionary of Film (fourth edition). New York: Alfred A. Knopf, October 2002, pp. 521–2.

1907 births
2000 deaths
American people of Russian-Jewish descent
American television directors
Western (genre) film directors
Film directors from New York City
People from Brooklyn
People from Marina del Rey, California
DeWitt Clinton High School alumni
Film directors from California
People from the Upper East Side